East 162nd Avenue station is a MAX light rail station on the boundary between Portland and Gresham in Oregon, USA. It serves the Blue Line and is the 18th stop eastbound on the current Eastside MAX branch.

The station is at the intersection of East Burnside Street and NE/SE 162nd Avenue. It has staggered side platforms, which sit on either side of the cross street. Trains operate in the median of Burnside Street and the two platforms are located immediately after a train crosses 162nd Avenue, in both directions.

Bus line connections
Since March 2018, the station has been served by the 74 bus line to 74 - 162nd Ave, which was newly introduced at that time.

References

External links
Station information (with eastbound ID number) from TriMet
Station information (with westbound ID number) from TriMet
MAX Light Rail Stations – more general TriMet page

MAX Light Rail stations
MAX Blue Line
Buildings and structures in Gresham, Oregon
1986 establishments in Oregon
Railway stations in the United States opened in 1986
Railway stations in Multnomah County, Oregon